The following list of Carnegie libraries in South Carolina provides detailed information on United States Carnegie libraries in South Carolina, where 14 public libraries were built from 14 grants (totaling $124,700) awarded by the Carnegie Corporation of New York from 1903 to 1916. In addition, academic libraries were built at 4 institutions (totaling $65,000).

Key

Public libraries

Academic libraries

Notes

References
 
 
 
 

Note: The above references, while all authoritative, are not entirely mutually consistent. Some details of this list may have been drawn from one of the references without support from the others. Reader discretion is advised.

South Carolina
 
Libraries
Libraries